Michałów means a place owned by Michał (Michael) and may refer to more than 30 places in Poland, including the following:
Michałów, Polkowice County in Lower Silesian Voivodeship (south-west Poland)
Michałów, Gmina Środa Śląska in Lower Silesian Voivodeship (south-west Poland)
Michałów, Gmina Brzeziny in Łódź Voivodeship (central Poland)
Michałów, Gmina Dmosin in Łódź Voivodeship (central Poland)
Michałów, Kutno County in Łódź Voivodeship (central Poland)
Michałów, Piotrków County in Łódź Voivodeship (central Poland)
Michałów, Radomsko County in Łódź Voivodeship (central Poland)
Michałów, Tomaszów Mazowiecki County in Łódź Voivodeship (central Poland)
Michałów, Zduńska Wola County in Łódź Voivodeship (central Poland)
Michałów, Zgierz County in Łódź Voivodeship (central Poland)
Michałów, Lublin Voivodeship (east Poland)
Michałów, Opatów County in Świętokrzyskie Voivodeship (south-central Poland)
Michałów, Ostrowiec County in Świętokrzyskie Voivodeship (south-central Poland)
Michałów, Pińczów County in Świętokrzyskie Voivodeship (south-central Poland)
Michałów, Skarżysko County in Świętokrzyskie Voivodeship (south-central Poland)
Michałów, Kozienice County in Masovian Voivodeship (east-central Poland)
Michałów, Lipsko County in Masovian Voivodeship (east-central Poland)
Michałów, Łosice County in Masovian Voivodeship (east-central Poland)
Michałów, Mińsk County in Masovian Voivodeship (east-central Poland)
Michałów, Nowy Dwór Mazowiecki County in Masovian Voivodeship (east-central Poland)
Michałów, Radom County in Masovian Voivodeship (east-central Poland)
Michałów, Wołomin County in Masovian Voivodeship (east-central Poland)
Michałów, Żyrardów County in Masovian Voivodeship (east-central Poland)
Michałów, Kalisz County in Greater Poland Voivodeship (west-central Poland)
Michałów, Ostrzeszów County in Greater Poland Voivodeship (west-central Poland)
Michałów, Gmina Nowe Miasto nad Wartą in Greater Poland Voivodeship (west-central Poland)
Michałów, Gmina Kłomnice in Silesian Voivodeship (south Poland)
Michałów, Gmina Koniecpol in Silesian Voivodeship (south Poland)
Michałów, Gmina Poczesna in Silesian Voivodeship (south Poland)
Michałów, Opole Voivodeship (south-west Poland)
Gmina Michałów 

Michalów refers to:
Michalów, Tomaszów Lubelski County, Lublin Voivodeship
Michalów, Zamość County, Lublin Voivodeship

See also
 Michałowo (disambiguation)